The Orpheum Theatre at 842 S. Broadway in Downtown Los Angeles opened on February 15, 1926, as the fourth and final Los Angeles venue for the Orpheum vaudeville circuit. After a $3 million renovation, started in 1989, it is the most restored of the historical movie palaces in the city. Three previous theatres also bore the name Orpheum before the one at 842 Broadway was the final one with that moniker.

The Orpheum has a Beaux Arts facade designed by movie theater architect G. Albert Lansburgh and has a Mighty Wurlitzer organ, installed in 1928, that is one of three pipe organs remaining in Southern California.

The Orpheum theatres are named for the Greek mythological figure, Orpheus.

Orpheum venues in Los Angeles
The first site for the Orpheum vaudeville circuit was the Grand Opera House, also known as the Grand Theater, 110 S. Main Street (built 1884, closed 1937).

The second Orpheum venue was the Orpheum Theatre (previously known as the Los Angeles Theatre and later known as the Lyceum Theatre, at 227 S. Spring Street (opened 1888, closed 1941).

The third venue was the Orpheum Theatre now known as the Palace Theatre, 630 S. Broadway (built 1911, still standing).

Venue performers 

Soon after it was opened, it was a popular venue for burlesque queen Sally Rand, the Marx Brothers, Will Rogers, Judy Garland (singing with her family as Frances "Baby" Gumm) and comedian Jack Benny, as well as jazz greats Lena Horne, Ella Fitzgerald and Duke Ellington. Vaudeville acts were still playing the Orpheum as late as 1950.

In the 1960s, the theater held rock 'n' roll concerts featuring Little Richard, Aretha Franklin and Little Stevie Wonder. The restored Orpheum Theatre is now a venue for live concerts, movie premieres, and location shoots.  The love metal band HIM played there for their live CD/DVD album Digital Versatile Doom. The 2010 Streamy Awards were live broadcast from the theater.

Location shoots

Television
 Julie and the Phantoms
American Idol (Hollywood Week seasons 4, 5, 6, 14, 17, 18, 20)
America's Got Talent 
 The Apprentice (season 5 finale)
RuPaul's Drag Race (season 7, 8 and 11 finales)
Hollywood (miniseries)
Pretty Little Liars (season 4 finale and season 5 episode 1)
Angel (1999 TV series) (season 3 episode 13)Glee (season 5 episode 11)The West Wing (TV Series 1999-2006) (2020 Special Cast Reunion) (A West Wing Special To Benefit When We All Vote)FilmLast Action Hero (1993)Why Do Fools Fall in Love (1998)A Mighty Wind (2003)Transformers (2007)Alvin and the Chipmunks (2007)In Search of a Midnight Kiss (2007)Hop (2011)The Shape of Water'' (2017)

Music Videos
Akon - “Lonely”
Avril Lavigne - "I'm With You"
The Backstreet Boys - "Shape of my heart"
Kelly Rowland - "Can't Nobody" 
Guns N' Roses - "November Rain"
Brandi Carlile - "The Story" 
Michael Jackson - "Thriller"
Taylor Swift - "Mean"

See also
Broadway Theater District (Los Angeles)
Million Dollar Theater
Los Angeles Theatre
Tower Theatre (Los Angeles)

References

External links

 Orpheum Theatre website
 Extensive information about the theatre

Movie palaces
Buildings and structures in Downtown Los Angeles
Theatres in Los Angeles
Vaudeville theaters
Los Angeles Historic-Cultural Monuments
Historic district contributing properties in California
Theatres completed in 1926
1926 establishments in California
Theatres on the National Register of Historic Places in Los Angeles
Public venues with a theatre organ